The Pasig Revolving Tower is a 12-storey building in Pasig, Metro Manila, Philippines.

History
Formerly the Mutya ng Pasig Tower, Pasig Revolving Tower was built as an 11-storey building in 1974 in an area then covered with rice paddies and some houses. The structure was built near the Mutya ng Pasig public market during the administration of then-Pasig Mayor Emiliano Caruncho Jr.. It features a revolving restaurant on the then-topmost floor, one of the two existing revolving restaurants in the Metro Manila area at that time; the other dining outlet was at the Manila Royal Hotel in Quiapo, Manila which is already defunct.

The national economic crisis that followed the Assassination of Benigno Aquino Jr. in 1983, caused tenants occupying the building to be unable to pay rent to the Pasig government. For the next several years, only the first three floors of the Pasig Revolving Tower was occupied, mainly by local department offices. It also served as a storage facility for the nearby market.

Renovation
Mayor Robert Eusebio, an architecture graduate, commissioned an architectural and structural study of the Pasig Revolving Tower in 2006 with the intent of renovating the building. The study was finished in 2008. Renovation works on the tower began in 2015 under the tenure of Mayor Maribel Eusebio, Robert's wife and an architect. The main contractor of the renovation was Interbuild Construction which facilitated the addition of a 12th floor and a viewing deck. Majority of the changes was the interior designs per floor and the revolving restaurant was retained on the eleventh floor. It was finished within 2016, during Robert Eusebio's second non-consecutive term which started in the same year, and was re-inaugurated on November 18, 2016.

References

Buildings and structures in Pasig
Towers completed in 1974
Buildings and structures with revolving restaurants
Commercial buildings completed in 1974
Government buildings completed in 1974
Observation towers in the Philippines